Nighoj is a village in Ahmednagar District, Maharashtra, India. It is about 90 kilometres away from Pune and had naturally created potholes (tinajas) on the riverbed of the Kukadi River.

Geologists indicate that formerly there was greater rainfall in the area and that the Kukadi River flowed out from the highlands, scouring the bedrock and forming the potholes and the gorge.

Religion

The majority of the population in Nighoj is Hindu, but there are also Muslims. There are several temples in the village, one of which, the Malaganga temple, is located on the bank of the gorge on the old river-bed itself

See also
 Parner tehsil
 List of Villages in Parner Tehsil

References

External links

 

Villages in Ahmednagar district
Villages in Parner taluka
Cities and towns in Ahmednagar district